This is a list of recipients of the Sasakawa Health Prize awarded by World Health Organization (WHO).

On the idea and with financial support from Mr Ryōichi Sasakawa (1899–1995), Chairman of the Japan Shipbuilding Industry Foundation and President of the Sasakawa Memorial Health Foundation, the award was founded in 1984. The Sasakawa Health Prize consists of a statuette and money of the order of $30,000 USD to be given to a person(s) and/or of the order of $40,000 USD to be given to an institution(s), who have accomplished outstanding innovative work in health development, such as the promotion of specific health programmes or significant advancements in primary health care, to encourage the further development of health.

List of recipients

See also 

 List of Ihsan Doğramacı Family Health Foundation Prize laureates
 List of Léon Bernard Foundation Prize laureates
 List of United Arab Emirates Health Foundation Prize laureates
 List of Sheikh Sabah Al-Ahmad Al-Jaber Al-Sabah Prize laureates
 List of Dr LEE Jong-wook Memorial Prize for Public Health laureates
 List of Dr A.T. Shousha Foundation Prize and Fellowship laureates
 List of The State of Kuwait Prize for the Control of Cancer, Cardiovascular Diseases and Diabetes in the Eastern Mediterranean Region laureates
 List of Jacques Parisot Foundation Fellowship laureates
 List of The Darling Foundation Prize laureates

References 

World Health Organization
Public health
Sasakawa Health Prize laureates